This page lists public opinion polls conducted for the 2017 French presidential election, which was held on 23 April 2017 with a run-off on 7 May 2017.

Unless otherwise noted, all polls listed below are compliant with the regulations of the national polling commission (Commission nationale des sondages) and utilize the quota method.

First round 
Ifop-Fiducial and OpinionWay polls listed in the tables below starting in February 2017 are "rolling" polls unless otherwise denoted by an asterisk (*). The poll by Belgian pollster Dedicated Research commissioned by La Libre Belgique and RTBF and published on 20 February 2017, marked with two asterisks (**) in the table below, was not subject to French regulations.

Polls marked with three asterisks (***) from Scan Research/Le Terrain use CATI and random number dialing, unlike all other pollsters, which conduct online surveys using the quota method. The polling commission published notices for each of the two polls conducted by Scan Research/Le Terrain.

Alain Juppé, who lost the primary of the right and centre to Fillon, was floated to replace him as a result of the Fillon affair (Penelopegate). Though tested in some hypothetical polls, Juppé announced on 6 March that he would not be a candidate, regardless of what happened with Fillon.

Graphical summary 
The averages in the graphs below were constructed using polls listed below conducted by the eight major French pollsters. The graphs are smoothed 14-day weighted moving averages, using only the most recent poll conducted by any given pollster within that range (each poll weighted based on recency).

François Bayrou of the Democratic Movement (MoDem) renounced a potential candidacy on 22 February 2017 and instead proposed an alliance with Emmanuel Macron, which he accepted. Yannick Jadot of Europe Ecology – The Greens (EELV) announced that he would withdraw his candidacy and endorsed Benoît Hamon on 23 February after negotiating a common platform with the Socialist nominee; the agreement was approved by the EELV primary voters on 26 February.

Official campaign 
This table below lists polls completed since the publication of the official list of candidates on 18 March until the first round vote on 23 April 2017. The publication of first-round polls was prohibited after midnight on 21 April 2017.

26 January to 16 March 2017 

With additional sponsorship-collecting candidates

25 November 2016 to 25 January 2017

8 July to 24 November 2016

14 January to 7 July 2016 

With additional sponsorship-collecting candidates

9 October 2012 to 13 January 2016

By region

By constituency

Second round 
After the first round of the 2002 presidential election, in which opinion polls failed to anticipate Jean-Marie Le Pen advancing to the second round, the French polling commission (Commission nationale des sondages) recommended that pollsters not publish second-round surveys before the results of the first round. However, understanding that polling institutes would nevertheless be likely to do so, it also recommended that second-round scenarios be tested based on first-round polling, and to test several plausible scenarios, broadly construed.

Ifop-Fiducial and OpinionWay polls listed in the tables below starting in February 2017 are "rolling" polls unless otherwise denoted by an asterisk (*). Polls marked with three asterisks (***) from Scan Research/Le Terrain use CATI and random number dialing, unlike all other pollsters, which conduct online surveys using the quota method. The polling commission published notices for each of the two polls conducted by Scan Research/Le Terrain.

The publication of second-round polls was prohibited after midnight on 5 May 2017.

Graphical summary 
The averages in the graphs below were constructed using polls listed below conducted by the eight major French pollsters. The graphs are smoothed 14-day weighted moving averages, using only the most recent poll conducted by any given pollster within that range (each poll weighted based on recency). The actual votes gave 66,10% to Macron and 33.90% to Le Pen of expressed votes, shown by larger dots on the right side of the curves.

Macron–Le Pen

By first round vote

By region

Fillon–Le Pen 
Graphical summary

By region

Macron–Fillon

By region

Mélenchon–Macron

By region

Mélenchon–Fillon

By region

Mélenchon–Le Pen

By region

Valls–Le Pen

Hollande–Le Pen

Hollande–Fillon

Juppé–Le Pen

Hollande–Juppé

Macron–Juppé

Sarkozy–Le Pen

Hollande–Sarkozy

Valls–Sarkozy

Macron–Sarkozy

Le Maire–Le Pen

See also 
Opinion polling for the French legislative election, 2017
Opinion polling for the French presidential election, 2002
Opinion polling for the French presidential election, 2007
Opinion polling for the French presidential election, 2012

References

External links 
Notices of the French polling commission 
Continuous results for the OpinionWay rolling poll 
Depuis 1958 
Sondages en France 

Opinion polling in France
2017 French presidential election
France